In public transport, Route 12 may refer to:

Route 12 (MTA Maryland), a bus route in Baltimore, Maryland and its suburbs
Citybus Route 12, a bus route in Hong Kong
London Buses route 12
Melbourne tram route 12
Nockebybanan, a tramway in Stockholm

12